Dindigul District is one of the 38 districts in the state of Tamil Nadu in India. Dindigul District is the second largest district in Tamil Nadu by area after Thiruvannamalai District. The district was carved out of Madurai District in 1985. It has an area of 6266.64 km2 and comprises 3 revenue divisions, 10 taluks, and 14 panchayat unions. The district is bound by Tiruppur district in the northwest, Karur district in the northeast, Tiruchirapalli district in the east, Madurai and Theni districts in the south, and Idukki district of Kerala to the west. As of 2011, the district had a population of 2,159,775 with a sex-ratio of 998 females for every 1,000 males.

Economy
In 2006, the Ministry of Panchayati Raj named Dindigul one of the country's 250 most backward districts (out of a total of 640). It is one of the six districts in Tamil Nadu currently receiving funds from Backward Regions Grant Fund Programme (BRGF).

Demographics

According to 2011 census, Dindigul district had a population of 2,159,775 with a sex-ratio of 998 females for every 1,000 males, much above the national average of 929. 37.41% of the population lived in urban areas. A total of 216,576 were under the age of six, constituting 111,955 males and 104,621 females. Scheduled Castes and Scheduled Tribes accounted for 20.95% and 0.37% of the population, respectively. The average literacy of the district was 68.61%, compared to the national average of 72.99%. The district had a total of 560,773 households. There were a total of 1,105,155 workers, comprising 155,332 cultivators, 388,725 main agricultural labourers, 25,253 in house hold industries, 393,707 other workers, 142,138 marginal workers, 10,073 marginal cultivators, 79,234 marginal agricultural labourers, 5,576 marginal workers in household industries and 47,255 other marginal workers.

At the time of the 2011 census, 91.52% of the population spoke Tamil, 5.45% Telugu and 1.69% Kannada as their first language.

Politics 

|}

Places of interest
Kodaikanal
Palani - Murugan Temple
Sirumalai
Dindigul RockFort
Pachalur hills Oddanchatram
Thalakuthu falls
Athoor Dam
Narikkalpatti, agriculture, weaving
Rangamalai Vedasandur
Mounaguru swami, Kasavanampatti
Kalthurai
Kopanaswamymalai, Reddiyarchatram
Mandavadi
Pulla veli water Fall's
Pandri malai,Thandikudi hills
Athoor - Sadaiyandi Temple
Soundaraja Temple - Thadikombu
Thirumalaigoundenvalasu
Veerachinnampatty
Vembarpatti
Viruveedu

See also
List of districts of Tamil Nadu

References

External links

 Dindigul District
 Dindigul district - A profile - The Hindu, Monday, 15 Feb 2010

 
Districts of Tamil Nadu